The Nickel Trophy is presented to the winner of the currently annual football game between the rival University of North Dakota (UND) Fighting Hawks and the North Dakota State University (NDSU) Bison. The two universities are approximately 76 miles apart on the eastern border of North Dakota. The two schools suspended play in 2003 and resumed play in 2015. In the entire history of the rivalry, the game has never been contested anywhere beside Grand Forks or Fargo.

The Trophy
Robert Kunkel, a UND alumnus and Chicago advertising executive, was the originator of the trophy, and Blue Key, an honorary service fraternity at NDSU, and the UND Blue Key (Student Government after their Blue Key Chapter dissolved)  administered the annual awarding. It is an oversized 75-pound replica of the James Earle Fraser-designed U.S. buffalo nickel with a buffalo on one side  representing NDSU Bison and a Native American head on the other side representing UND, who were known as the Fighting Sioux until 2012. Fraser, best known for his sculpture, "The End of The Trail", was born in Winona, MN and lived for a time in Dakota Territory. The coin-shaped trophy's "mint" date is 1937, the year the trophy was created. Jack Sather, a native of New England, ND, was commissioned to design and act a sculpture of the award. It took six weeks to complete the job and he was paid $1,650 for his work. Those funds were raised by both NDSU and UND Blue Key chapters from members and friends. The Nickel, at 250 times larger than a regular five-cent piece, weighs 75 pounds and is 2 inches thick and 22 inches in diameter. Both sides were 3/4" relief and, from the original models, plaster casts were poured. The casts were hauled to a St. Paul, MN foundry where plaster copies were recast in an aluminum alloy. The halves were welded together to make the finished piece. It was first awarded in 1938 when NDSU won 17–13. It has been the object of many theft and "kidnapping" attempts by students from both universities. Governor William Langer was asked to participate in the unveiling of the new award in Grand Forks. Moments after the unveiling an unidentified student stepped up to Governor Langer, told him "I'll take care of this for you", and disappeared with the nickel trophy. It turned up 36 hours later on the front lawn of then UND President John C. West (The Forum of Fargo-Moorhead, October 21, 1967) and a new tradition of "kidnapping" or "borrowing" the trophy had begun. The Trophy retired after the 2003 season. Upon renewal of the "rivalry" games being played in 2015, the trophy remains retired and sits at the Heritage Center in Bismarck.

History

Prior to 2004, the game was one of the most played college football contests, with 110 meetings spanning several decades with the first official game in 1894. UND leads the all-time series 62–50, with 3 ties. In games where the Nickel Trophy has been contested (since 1938), UND leads the series 35-30. The last NDSU win in a game in which the trophy was at stake was in 2000, 16–13. The two playoff games between the teams (1994 and 1995) are not considered part of the Nickel series, and it has been agreed on by both schools that only the regular season scheduled game would determine the Nickel's rightful owner according to former Blue Key member and chapter adviser Tim Flakoll. The Nickel Trophy was not at stake in 2015 (a game won 34–9 by the Bison) due to the now-abandoned Sioux logo remaining on one side.

Both teams have had long winning streaks in the series. The most recent streaks of significant length were in 1981–1992, where the Bison won 12 straight games in the series, including two shutout wins (1985 and 1989)- and in 1993–1996, where the then-Fighting Sioux snapped the losing streak by winning four straight regular-season games. (As mentioned, the two teams did play playoff games in 1994 and 1995 respectively—the Sioux winning in 1994 and the Bison in 1995). Of more historical relevance, UND had won 12 straight from 1953-1964 before the Bison snapped that streak with a 6-3 victory at Fargo in 1965.

Since 1921, NDSU and UND competed as charter members in the NCAA Division II North Central Conference. In 2002, NDSU announced their intention to move their football program to the Division I-AA level (and athletic program as a whole to Division I). Following NDSU's reclassification, agreement for the schools to continue competing on the field could not be reached between the two universities due to UND's athletic department. Thus the series went on indefinite hiatus after the 2003 season. In mid-2006, UND announced their intention to move their athletic programs to Division I as well and the 2008 season was their first in Division I, opening the door for the rivalry to restart. However, while North Dakota State were members of the Missouri Valley Football Conference in football, and the Summit League in non-football sports. North Dakota joined the Big Sky Conference, complicating the matter for scheduling future games.

Scheduling logistics with their respective conferences and the yearly frequency of the potential resumption of the series were the stated reasons for not resuming. Several high-profile alumni and sports figures had called for a resumption of the series, and  a grassroots movement form for the legislature to require an annual game by law.

On December 12, 2010, The Bison hosted North Dakota in men's basketball at the Fargodome in front of an NDSU basketball record crowd of 10,709 for the first athletic meeting between the two schools as Division I opponents.

On May 16, 2012, UND athletic director Brian Faison announced that UND and NDSU had been planning a contract for two more games between each other, both in Fargo in 2015 and 2019. On August 22, 2014, UND athletics announced the signing of the contract for two games against NDSU to be played in Fargo on September 19, 2015 and September 7, 2019.
On September 9, 2015 #2 ranked NDSU hosted the newly rebranded Fighting Hawks in the first Nickel Trophy matchup in 12 years. The game, which the Bison won 34-9, received ample media attention as the long-running series returned. On January 26, 2017 North Dakota announced that they would move to the Summit League for non-football for the 2018 season, and football-only Missouri Valley Football Conference for the 2020 season. The UND–NDSU matchup became a conference rivalry in non-football sports once again in 2018 when the Fighting Hawks joined the Summit League, and became a conference football rivalry in 2020 when UND and NDSU were reunited in the MVFC.

Game results

See also 
 List of NCAA college football rivalry games
 List of most-played college football series in NCAA Division I

References

College football rivalries in the United States
College football rivalry trophies in the United States
North Dakota Fighting Hawks football
North Dakota State Bison football
1894 establishments in North Dakota